The 2025 U Sports Men's Final 8 Basketball Tournament is scheduled to be held March 13–16, 2025, in Vancouver, British Columbia, to determine a national champion for the 2024–25 U Sports men's basketball season.

Host
The tournament is scheduled to be hosted by the University of British Columbia at the school's Doug Mitchell Thunderbird Sports Centre and UBC War Memorial Gymnasium. It will take place at the same time as the 2025 U Sports Women's Basketball Championship, necessitating the need for two venues, which is also the first time in U Sports history that both tournaments were hosted by one school in the same year. This will be the third time that UBC has hosted the tournament with the first taking place in 1972 and the most recent taking place in 2016.

Scheduled teams
Canada West Representative
OUA Representative
RSEQ Representative
AUS Representative
Host (UBC Thunderbirds)
Three additional berths

References

External links
 Tournament Web Site

2024–25 in Canadian basketball
U Sports Men's Basketball Championship
2025 in men's basketball
University of British Columbia
Basketball in British Columbia